Orange Grove was probably of Danish origin. She first appeared in British records in 1800. She made one complete voyage as a slave ship in the triangular trade in enslaved people. The French captured her in 1804 during her second slave trading voyage after she had embarked slaves but before she could land them in the West Indies.

Career
Orange Grove first appeared in Lloyd's Register (LR), and the Register of Shipping (RS) in 1801. Lloyd's Register described her as Danish, built in 1788. (Later, it changed her launch year as 1798. The Register of Shipping described her as a "DP.97", i.e, a Dutch prize, captured in 1797. The Trans-Atlantic slave Trade Database describes her as having been launched in 1788, and to have been of United States registry.

Orange Grove, Nazeby, master, was reported in August 1800 to have arrived at Hamburg from Liverpool, and then in 1801 at Cork from Liverpool. Later, with Hanna, master, she was reported to have arrived at Liverpool from Trinidad.

1st slave voyage (1801–1802): Captain Thomas Payne sailed from Liverpool on 19 November 1801. Orange Groves owners were Joseph Ward and Thomas Moss. Payne acquired slaves at New Calabar and arrived at the Bahamas on 5 July 1802 with 254 slaves. She went on to Havana and Louisiana. She left for England on 6 October and arrived back at Liverpool on 25 November. She had sailed from Liverpool with 32 crew members and had suffered eight crew deaths on her voyage.

 

2nd slave voyage (1802): Captain Payne sailed from Liverpool on 11 February 1803. On 16 February, Orange Grove, Payne, master was driven ashore on the Half Mile Rocks. She was on a voyage from Liverpool to Africa. A few days later she was gotten off.

War with France had resumed after Captain Payne had sailed. Still, Thomas Payne acquired a letter of marque on 30 July 1803.

Orange Grove was reported at Gorée, and then on 23 September to have arrived at Loanga. He sailed from Loanga on 14 December.

Fate
Lloyd's List reported in April 1804 that the French had captured Orange Grove, Payne, master, as she was sailing to the West Indies from  Africa. They took her into Guadeloupe. Lloyd's Register for 1805 carried the annotation "captured" beneath her name.

In May 1804 Lloyd's List reported that an Orange Grove, no master's name given, was at Jamaica, having come from Liverpool. Other reports make clear that the vessel in question was Orange, Grove, master. Orange Grove herself appeared on a French list of 92 prizes taken into Guadeloupe.

Citations

1800 ships
Age of Sail merchant ships of England
Liverpool slave ships
Captured ships